Purr-Chance to Dream is a 1967 short and the final Tom and Jerry short produced under MGM Animation/Visual Arts, and was directed by Ben Washam and produced by Chuck Jones. This is the final short of the original Tom and Jerry series until 2001's The Mansion Cat, and the final theatrical Tom and Jerry short of the entire franchise until 2005's The Karate Guard.

Plot
Tom wakes up after a nightmare of being turned into a nail-shape and pounded into the ground by a giant bulldog. When he sees Jerry catching a bone, he flicks the bone with his finger and then Jerry wallops him on the head with it and runs off, stopping at a giant dog house. When Tom approaches it, he realises it wasn't a dream and runs off in horror.

Instead, a small bulldog (first seen in The Cat's Me-Ouch!) comes out. When Tom grabs Jerry, the bulldog grabs his tail and rapidly eats away at Tom's fur, spinning in a blur, until Tom is literally bits of sausage except for his head, and pounding his head to the ground. Jerry pats the bulldog as a reward, in which the bulldog licks Jerry in the face and snuggles up.

Tom has several attempts at catching Jerry, even attempting to attack the dog with a hammer, stuffing an oversized bone with a grenade, spraying himself with dog repellent, and lastly playing fetch with the dog by throwing a stick into a safe, and hurling the safe into a deep pit.

However, every time the minuscule pup manages to eat away at Tom, and in the final attempt when he grabs the mouse, the pup manages to chew at Tom's fur until he is bits of sausage again.

Tom finally gives up, he takes some medicine and plays some smooth jazz on a record before going to sleep and calmly dreaming of being pounded once again into the ground, which to Tom, doesn't seem so scary and has now become a rather pleasant thought, after all, it's better than dealing with that tiny dog.

Crew
Animation: Dick Thompson, Ken Harris, Don Towsley, Tom Ray & Philip Roman 
Graphics: Don Foster
Layouts: Don Morgan
Backgrounds: Philip DeGuard
Design Consultant: Maurice Noble
Vocal Effects: Mel Blanc, William Hanna & June Foray
Production Manager: Earl Jonas
Story: Irv Spector, Michael Maltese & Chuck Jones
Music: Carl Brandt
Production Supervised by Les Goldman
Produced by Chuck Jones
Directed by Ben Washam & Chuck Jones

Production notes
Jones and Michael Maltese get additional director (Jones) and writer (Maltese and Jones) credits for reused footage from The Cat's Me-Ouch!. It was the last short in the series by MGM, the last of Jones' shorts, and the second-to-last short by MGM after The Bear That Wasn't. The next theatrical Tom and Jerry short, The Karate Guard, would be released in 2005 by Warner Bros.

The title is a play-on-words of "perchance to dream", a quotation from William Shakespeare's Hamlet.

External links

1967 films
1960s American animated films
1967 comedy films
1967 animated films
1967 short films
Animated films without speech
Short films directed by Ben Washam
Tom and Jerry short films
MGM Animation/Visual Arts short films
Films about nightmares
1960s English-language films